The 1999 Saint Francis Cougars football team represented the University of Saint Francis, located in Fort Wayne, Indiana, in the 1999 NAIA football season. They were led by head coach Kevin Donley, who served his 2nd year as the first and only head coach in the history of Saint Francis football.  The Cougars played their home games at Cougar Stadium and were members of the Mid-States Football Association (MSFA) Mideast League (MEL). The Cougars finished in 1st place in the MSFA MEL division, receiving an automatic bid to the 1999 postseason NAIA playoffs.

The Cougars completed the season with an overall record of 8-3, the first winning season in school history.  The three losses were at the hands of a Division-I program and against two NAIA ranked opponents.  With their success in the regular season, the Cougars participated in their first-ever NAIA postseason playoff.  They traveled to then #1-ranked Georgetown, where a 38-0 loss to the Tigers ended the Cougars' playoffs and season.

Schedule 
(8-3 overall, 6-0 conference)

Game summaries
09/11/1999 - With a 42-38 victory over Saint Xavier, the Cougars picked up their first home win in program history today.

10/9/1999 - The Cougars traveled to Tiffin, OH to play the 18th-ranked Tiffin Dragons.  The Cougars returned home with a 21-14 victory.  It was the first time in Cougars' football history that they defeated a ranked opponent.

10/23/1999 - A 54-36 victory at home against the Trinity International Trojans marked the 4th consecutive win for the Cougars.  Their success was noted in the 10/26/1999 Coaches Poll. The Cougars were ranked 25th, marking the first time a Cougars football team had appeared in the NAIA football polls.

11/13/1999 - The Cougars traveled to North Canton, OH to play the 19th-ranked Walsh Cavaliers.  The Cougars returned home with a 40-21 victory.  It was the Cougars' second consecutive win over a ranked team.  The victory completed a perfect 6-0 conference schedule and brought the Cougars their first-ever MSFA MEL title.

Ranking movements

References

Saint Francis
Saint Francis Cougars football seasons
Saint Francis Cougars football